"Are You Gonna Go My Way" is a song by American musician Lenny Kravitz, released in February 1993 as the first single from his third studio album, Are You Gonna Go My Way (1993). It was written by Kravitz and Craig Ross, and has been covered by numerous artists, such as Metallica, in a medley for "MTV Hits" at the 2003 MTV Music Video Awards, Tom Jones for the Jerky Boys OST, Robbie Williams on Jones' 1999 album Reload and Mel B in her solo section of the Spice Girls 2007 Reunion Tour. Serbian hard rock band Cactus Jack recorded a version on their live cover album DisCover in 2002. A remixed version is played as the opening theme song in Gran Turismo 3: A-spec. Adam Lambert covered the song in November 2012 in his swing through South Africa.

Chart performance
"Are You Gonna Go My Way" was released as an airplay-only single in the US and thus was not eligible to chart on the Billboard Hot 100, but reached number one on the Album Rock Tracks and number two on the Modern Rock Tracks. It also reached the top 5 in the UK, peaking at number four. It is still Kravitz's most successful single in Australia, where it peaked at number-one for six weeks through April and May 1993. 

"Are You Gonna Go My Way" is the only Diamond certified single in Brazil, with over 500,000 downloads.

Critical reception
AllMusic editor Stephen Thomas Erlewine described the song as "roaring". A reviewer from Billboard said it is Kravitz's "hardest and fastest to date". An editor, Larry Flick, described it as a "passionate" track, that is "wrapped in the kind of retro, Jimi Hendrix-style guitar riffs that album-rock programmers go wild for." He added, "Spare boogie rhythms and a simply irresistible hook provide added radio incentive." Tony Harris from The Corsair called it a "throwaway hit single". David Browne from Entertainment Weekly felt that it "opens with a blast of phase-shifter electric guitar that could have been lifted directly off an old Jimi Hendrix or Isley Brothers album. And the lyrics are prime Kravitz." Dave Sholin from the Gavin Report declared it as "'90s rock", adding that "it doesn't get much better than this." Adam Sweeting from The Guardian remarked that Kravitz is "rocking it up a bit on the riffsome title track". In his weekly UK chart commentary, James Masterton wrote, "Kravitz returns to his own career in full Jimi Hendrix mode and at a stroke matching the peak of his biggest hit ever "It Ain't Over 'til It's Over"." 

Pan-European magazine Music & Media commented, "A special warning before you fasten your headphones. Kravitz cracks your nut with his hardest rocking single to date. A delicious earache." John Kilgo from The Network Forty wrote that "shades of Hendrix-a nice grungy-driven guitar with a crunchy rhythm beat highlights this funked rock release." Rick de Yampert from The News Journal viewed it as "feverish Hendrix". Rick Marin from The New York Times described the music video as a "frenzied, orgiatic performance exhuming (if not reincarnating) the spirit of Jimi Hendrix, complete with phase-shifter guitar and sexily slurred lyrics." A reviewer from Reading Evening Post declared the song as a "mixture of stomping drums and guitars, built around a grinding sub-Hendrixian riff", adding that "it's a bit too relentless and repetitive" to achieve the top 20 success of "It Ain't Over 'til It's Over". Jamie Parmenter from Renowned for Sound named it a "stand out" from the album, complimenting it for being an anthem of the early 90s, "a rollicking fast-paced rock masterpiece that shows Lenny's eye for a chart-topping tune and mastery at a catchy riff." Leesa Daniels from Smash Hits declared it as "a scorcher".

Music video
A music video was shot to accompany the song, directed by American filmmaker Mark Romanek. It consisted of Kravitz and his band playing in a large circular arena, with three tiered balcones stepped back from the centre, filled by people dancing.  Above the band and the dancers, lighting designer, director Michael Keeling created a chandelier of 983 cylindrical 23cm incandescent light tubes (originally designed for aquarium use) that could be brightened and dimmed to create patterns of light. Cindy Blackman appears on drums in the music video, although she did not perform on the studio recording that plays in the video's audio track.

Awards
The success of the song and the music video led to Kravitz being nominated for and winning several awards:
Grammy Award for Best Rock Vocal Performance, Solo: Nominated
Grammy Award for Best Rock Song: Nominated
MTV Video Music Award for Best Art Direction: Nominated
MTV Video Music Award for Best Male Artist: Won

Track listings
UK CD 1
"Are You Gonna Go My Way"
"It Ain't Over 'til It's Over"
"Always on the Run"
"Let Love Rule"

UK CD 2 and Australian CD single
"Are You Gonna Go My Way"
"My Love"
"All My Life"
"Someone Like You"

UK 7-inch and cassette single
"Are You Gonna Go My Way"
"My Love"

Charts

Weekly charts

Year-end charts

Certifications and sales

See also
List of Billboard Mainstream Rock number-one songs of the 1990s
List of number-one singles in Australia during the 1990s
The Unplugged Collection, Volume One

References

1993 singles
1993 songs
Lenny Kravitz songs
MTV Video Music Award for Best Male Video
Music videos directed by Mark Romanek
Number-one singles in Australia
Protest songs
Robbie Williams songs
Song recordings produced by Lenny Kravitz
Songs written by Craig Ross
Songs written by Lenny Kravitz
Tom Jones (singer) songs
Virgin Records singles